The Thrifty Formation is a geologic formation in Texas. It preserves fossils.

See also

 List of fossiliferous stratigraphic units in Texas
 Paleontology in Texas

References
 

Geologic formations of Texas